Summit Lake is a small lake in Otsego County, New York. It is located northeast of North Edmeston. Summit Lake drains east via an unnamed creek which flows into Wharton Creek.

References 

Lakes of New York (state)
Lakes of Otsego County, New York